Teti is a comune (municipality) in the Province of Nuoro in the Italian region Sardinia, located about  north of Cagliari and about  southwest of Nuoro.

Teti borders the following municipalities: Austis, Ollolai, Olzai, Ovodda, Tiana.

Demographic evolution

References

Cities and towns in Sardinia